Cophomantella artonoma is a moth in the family Lecithoceridae. It was described by Edward Meyrick in 1936. It is known from the Democratic Republic of the Congo.

References

Moths described in 1936
Cophomantella
Taxa named by Edward Meyrick